Amity is a feminine given name which may refer to:

 Amity Dry (born 1978), Australian singer-songwriter and reality show contestant
 Amity Gaige (born 1972), American novelist
 Amity Rockwell (born 1993), American professional racing cyclist also known as Amity Gregg
 Amity Shlaes (born 1960), American conservative author and newspaper and magazine columnist
 Amity Blight, a fictional character from Disney television series The Owl House

English-language feminine given names